The 1985 Oklahoma State Cowboys football team represented Oklahoma State University in the Big Eight Conference during the 1985 NCAA Division I-A football season. In their second season under head coach Pat Jones, the Cowboys compiled an 8–4 record (4–3 against conference opponents), tied for third place in the conference, and outscored opponents by a combined total of 255 to 188.

The team's statistical leaders included Thurman Thomas with 1,650 rushing yards and 102 points scored, Ronnie Williams with 1,757 passing yards, and Bobby Riley with 659 receiving yards.

The team played its home games at Lewis Field in Stillwater, Oklahoma.

Schedule

Personnel

Season summary

Oklahoma

After the season

The 1986 NFL Draft was held on April 29–30, 1986. The following Cowboys were selected.

References

Oklahoma State
Oklahoma State Cowboys football seasons
Oklahoma State Cowboys football